Edward Cullen is one of the main characters of the Twilight book series and film.

Edward Cullen may also refer to:

Edward Cullen (bishop) (born 1933), Roman Catholic bishop
Ted Cullen aka Edward Luttrell Cullen (1895–1963), New Zealand politician